Florian Flecker (born 29 October 1995) is an Austrian professional footballer who plays as a right winger for Austrian Bundesliga club LASK.

Career

Early career
Flecker began his career at SVU Murau. In 2010, he moved to the youth department of Kapfenberger SV. From the season 2012–13, he played for the club's third team, ASC Rapid Kapfenberg, in the fifth-tier Oberliga. In August 2014, he made his debut for Kapfenberg's second team in the fourth-tier Landesliga Steiermark, when he was in the starting eleven on the first matchday of the 2014–15 season against SV Anger. In October 2014, he scored his first goal in the fourth tier in a 3–0 win over ASK Voitsberg. In May 2015, he was included in the first-team squad of Kapfenberg for the first time for a match against SC Austria Lustenau, but he did not make an appearance.

In July 2015, Flecker made his debut in the 2. Liga, when he came on as a substitute in the 81st minute of the 2015–16 season against Lustenau for João Victor. In August 2015, he was in the starting lineup for the first time for the first team in the match against SKN St. Pölten, being before replaced by Gerald Nutz at halftime. In March 2016, he scored his first goal in the second tier in a 2–1 win over FC Liefering. In his first season as a professional, he made 31 league appearances, scoring three goals. In the following season – 2016–17 – he played in 35 games and scored seven goals.

Austrian Bundesliga
In May 2017, Flecker joined Austrian Bundesliga club Wolfsberger AC, where he signed a two-year contract. In July, he made his debut for the Carinthians in the Bundesliga, when he came on as a substitute in the 70th minute for Mario Leitgeb in the first matchday of that season against Red Bull Salzburg in the 70th minute. In the following match, Wolfsberger AC faced SV Mattersburg with Flecker in the starting lineup for the first time. He scored his only goal in the Bundesliga for WAC in a 5–1 loss to Mattersburg in December 2017. In his first season in the Bundesliga, he made 31 appearances.

On 2 July 2018, despite an ongoing contract with WAC, he moved to recently promoted TSV Hartberg on a free transfer. He signed a one-year contract. He scored his first goal for Hartberg on 11 August 2018; again against Mattersburg. For Hartberg, he played in all 32 games during his sole season at the club, scoring seven goals. He was able to help sustain Hartberg in the Bundesliga for the following season.

In Germany
After the expiry of his contract with Hartberg, Flecker moved to recently promoted German Bundesliga club Union Berlin ahead of the 2019–20 season, signing a two-year contract. In his season at the capital club, he hardly played a role and ended up with no appearances; during the entire season, he only appeared in the matchday squad six times. For the 2020–21 season, he joined Würzburger Kickers in the 2. Bundesliga, where he signed a two-year contract.

Career statistics

References

External links
 
 

1995 births
Living people
Austrian footballers
Association football wingers
Kapfenberger SV players
Wolfsberger AC players
TSV Hartberg players
1. FC Union Berlin players
Würzburger Kickers players
Austrian Football Bundesliga players
2. Liga (Austria) players
2. Bundesliga players
Austrian expatriate footballers
Austrian expatriate sportspeople in Germany
Expatriate footballers in Germany
People from Voitsberg
Footballers from Styria